The chapters of the Metal Fight Beyblade manga are written and illustrated by Takafumi Adachi. In Japan, they have been published in Shogakukan's Monthly CoroCoro comics since September 2008.
The plot follows the adventures of Ginga Hagane, a beyblader who is searching for his hidden past.
He eventually meets up with a boy named Kenta Yumiya, and the two become fast friends. Kyouya Tategami, and Benkei from the Face Hunters become good guys and aid Ginga on his quest to defeat the evil Dark Nebula organization.

An airing anime adaptation, produced by Tatsunoko Pro and Synergy SP, co-produced by Nelvana premiered on TV Tokyo on April 5, 2009.

Since Metal Fight Beyblades debut, thirty six chapters have been released in Japan so far.
In the Monthly CoroCoro comics, the chapters do not have names, but rather an arc name and chapter number instead. The chapter names are only in the shinsōban manga volumes.

The individual chapters are collected by Shogakukan in a series of shinshōbon volumes.
The first volume was released on March 27, 2009.
The latest volume is eight, released on April 27, 2010.

The English-language version is being released in Singapore by Chuang Yi Publishing. The first English language volume was released on July 20, 2010 The latest English language volume was released on March 8, 2011.

The anime version of Metal Fight Beyblades plot is written differently than in the manga. One notable difference is that in the manga, the characters Beys transform for its upgrade, while in the anime, they just switch parts or get an entirely new Bey. Another notable difference is that in the manga, the characters started off with the Metal System,(4-piece top) while in the anime they started with the Hybrid Wheel System (5-piece top). Some parts of the story are different in the anime version than in the manga, but overall the plot is the same.

Volume list

Chapters not yet in shinshōbon format
These chapters have yet to be published in a shinshōbon volume. They were originally serialized in issues of CoroCoro Comics from August, 2011 onward.

 39. "Ultimate Bladers Chapter 5" (August 2011)

Notes
 Chapter 9 from the CoroCoro magazine was split into 2 different chapters in the shinsōban of Volume 2.
 Chapter 18 from the CoroCoro magazine was split into 2 different chapters in the shinsōban of Volumes 4 and 5.

References

External links
 Official D-Rights Metal Fight Beyblade website 
 Official JPN CoroCoro Metal Fight Beyblade website

Beyblade: Metal Fusion
Beyblade